Union Center Township is a township in Elk County, Kansas, USA.  As of the 2000 census, its population was 116.

Geography
According to the USGS, it contains three cemeteries: Bunker Hill, Clear Cut and Forest.

The streams of Bull Creek, Clear Creek, Rowe Branch Elk River and South Branch Elk River run through this township.

References
 USGS Geographic Names Information System (GNIS)

External links
 US-Counties.com
 City-Data.com

Townships in Elk County, Kansas
Townships in Kansas